The 1967–68 Regionalliga  was the fifth season of the Regionalliga, the second tier of the German football league system. The league operated in five regional divisions, Berlin, North, South, Southwest and West. The five league champions and all five runners-up, at the end of the season, entered a promotion play-off to determine the two clubs to move up to the Bundesliga for the next season. The two promotion spots went to the Regionalliga Berlin champions Hertha BSC Berlin and Regionalliga Süd runners-up Kickers Offenbach.

Regionalliga Nord									
The 1967–68 season saw two new clubs in the league, Phönix Lübeck and TuS Haste, both promoted from the Amateurliga, while no club had been relegated from the Bundesliga to the league.

Regionalliga Berlin									
The 1967–68 season saw two new clubs in the league, Alemannia 90 Berlin and Sportfreunde Neukölln, both promoted from the Amateurliga, while no club had been relegated from the Bundesliga to the league.

Regionalliga West									
The 1967–68 season saw five new clubs in the league, Fortuna Köln, VfB Bottrop and Lüner SV, all three promoted from the Amateurliga, while Rot-Weiß Essen and Fortuna Düsseldorf had been relegated from the Bundesliga to the league.

Regionalliga Südwest									
The 1967–68 season saw three new clubs in the league, SC Friedrichsthal, SC Ludwigshafen and SSV Mülheim, all three promoted from the Amateurliga, while no club had been relegated from the Bundesliga to the league.

Regionalliga Süd									
The 1967–68 season saw three new clubs in the league, Jahn Regensburg, SV Wiesbaden and TSG Backnang, all three promoted from the Amateurliga, while no club had been relegated from the Bundesliga to the league.

Bundesliga promotion round

Group 1

Group 2

References

Sources
 30 Jahre Bundesliga  30th anniversary special, publisher: kicker Sportmagazin, published: 1993
 kicker-Almanach 1990  Yearbook of German football, publisher: kicker Sportmagazin, published: 1989, 
 DSFS Liga-Chronik seit 1945  publisher: DSFS, published: 2005

External links
Regionalliga on the official DFB website 
kicker 
Das Deutsche Fussball Archiv  Historic German league tables

1967-68
2
Ger